Onalaska Omni Center is a municipal convention center and indoor sports arena in Onalaska, Wisconsin, which serves greater La Crosse County.

It was the home of the Coulee Region Chill of the North American Hockey League (NAHL) from the fall of 2010 until August 2014.

References

External links
 

Convention centers in Wisconsin
Buildings and structures in La Crosse County, Wisconsin
Sports venues in Wisconsin
Tourist attractions in La Crosse County, Wisconsin
Indoor ice hockey venues in Wisconsin